In mathematics, a dense graph is a graph in which the number of edges is close to the maximal number of edges (where every pair of vertices is connected by one edge). The opposite, a graph with only a few edges, is a sparse graph. The distinction of what constitutes a dense or sparse graph is ill-defined, and depends on context.

The graph density of simple graphs is defined to be the ratio of the number of edges  with respect to the maximum possible edges.

For undirected simple graphs, the graph density is:

For directed, simple graphs, the maximum possible edges is twice that of undirected graphs (as there are two directions to an edge) so the density is:

Upper density
Upper density is an extension of the concept of graph density defined above from finite graphs to infinite graphs. Intuitively, an infinite graph has arbitrarily large finite subgraphs with any density less than its upper density, and does not have arbitrarily large finite subgraphs with density greater than its upper density. It can be shown using the Erdős–Stone theorem that the upper density can only be 1 or one of the superparticular ratios  (see, e.g., Diestel, edition 5, p. 189).

Sparse and tight graphs
 and  define a graph as being -sparse if every nonempty subgraph with  vertices has at most  edges, and -tight if it is -sparse and has exactly  edges. Thus trees are exactly the -tight graphs, forests are exactly the -sparse graphs, and graphs with arboricity  are exactly the -sparse graphs. Pseudoforests are exactly the -sparse graphs, and the Laman graphs arising in rigidity theory are exactly the -tight graphs.

Other graph families not characterized by their sparsity can also be described in this way. For instance the facts that any planar graph with  vertices has at most  edges (except for graphs with fewer than 3 vertices), and that any subgraph of a planar graph is planar, together imply that the planar graphs are -sparse. However, not every -sparse graph is planar. Similarly, outerplanar graphs are -sparse and planar bipartite graphs are -sparse.

More precisely, it follows from a result of  that the graphs of arboricity at most  are exactly the -sparse graphs. Similarly, the graphs of degeneracy at most  are exactly the -sparse graphs.

Sparse and dense classes of graphs
 considered that the sparsity/density dichotomy makes it necessary to consider infinite graph classes instead of single graph instances. They defined somewhere dense graph classes as those classes of graphs for which there exists a threshold t such that every complete graph appears as a t-subdivision in a subgraph of a graph in the class. To the contrary, if such a threshold does not exist, the class is nowhere dense.

The classes of graphs with bounded degeneracy and of nowhere dense graphs are both included in the biclique-free graphs, graph families that exclude some complete bipartite graph as a subgraph .

See also
Bounded expansion
Dense subgraph

References
 Paul E. Black, Sparse graph, from Dictionary of Algorithms and Data Structures, Paul E. Black (ed.), NIST. Retrieved on 29 September 2005.
 . 
.
.

 .
 
.
.
.

Graph families